Karzin (also Romanized as Kārzīn; also known as Fathabad (Persian: فتح آباد), also Romanized as Fatḩābād) is a city in the Central District of Qir and Karzin County, Fars Province, Iran.  At the 2006 census its population was 7,953 with 1,651 families.

References

Populated places in Qir and Karzin County

Cities in Fars Province